Kanan may refer to:

People

Surname
Sean Kanan, American actor and TV host

Given name

Male 
Kanan Gill (born 1989), Indian stand-up comedian, actor, and internet personality
Kanan Guluyev, an Azerbaijani wrestler
Kanan Karimov (born 1976), an Azerbaijani Association football manager and former player
Kanan Makiya (born 1949), Iraqi American professor and former dissident
Kanan Malhotra, Indian model and television actor
Kanan Seyidov, an Azerbaijani military officer
Kanan Yusif-zada (born 1973), an Azerbaijani surgeon, professor, and military administrator

Female 
Kanan Devi (1916-1992), Indian actress and singer
Kanan Kaushal (born 1939), Indian actress
Kanan Minami (born 1979), a manga artist
Kanan Mishra (1944–2015), an Oriya writer

Pseudonym
Pen name of Yūko Ōtsuki, illustrator of Galaxy Angel manga

Fictional characters
Kanan, a character in the manga series, Saiyuki
Kanan Jarrus, a character in the Star Wars franchise
Kanan Matsuura, a character from the media-mix project, Love Live! Sunshine!!

Places
Kanan, Osaka, a town in Osaka Prefecture, Japan
Kanan, Pori, a district in Pori, Finland
Kanan-e Olya, a village in West Azerbaijan Province, Iran
Kanan-e Sofla, a village in West Azerbaijan Province, Iran
Kanan-Bakache, a village and commune in Niger, West Africa

Others
 Kanan (tigress)

See also
 
 Jianan (disambiguation) or Chianan, the Chinese pronunciation of characters read Kanan in Japanese

Unisex given names